Biljana Pantić Pilja, formerly known as Biljana Pantić, is a politician in Serbia. She has served in the National Assembly of Serbia since 2012 as a member of the Serbian Progressive Party.

Private career
Pantić Pilja has a bachelor's degree and a master's degree from the University of Novi Sad Faculty of Law. She is a lawyer by profession and has worked with the firm Vučević since 2011. She lives in Novi Sad.

Politician

Municipal politics
Pantić Pilja received the forty-sixth position on the electoral list of the far-right Serbian Radical Party for the Novi Sad municipal assembly in the 2008 Serbian local elections. The party won twenty-six out of seventy-eight mandates, and Pantić Pilja did not serve in its assembly delegation. 

The Radical Party experienced a serious split later in 2008, with several members joining the more moderate Progressive Party under the leadership of Tomislav Nikolić and Aleksandar Vučić. Pantić Pilja sided with the Progressives.

Parliamentarian
Pantić Pilja was given the sixtieth position on the Progressive Party's Let's Get Serbia Moving electoral list in the 2012 Serbian parliamentary election. The list won seventy-three mandates, and she was accordingly elected. After the election, the Progressive Party formed a new coalition government with the Socialist Party of Serbia and other parties; Pantić Pilja served as part of its parliamentary majority. She was promoted to the thirty-sixth position on the successor Aleksandar Vučić — Future We Believe In list for the 2014 parliamentary election and was re-elected when the list won a landslide victory with 158 out of 250 mandates. In the 2016, she received the eighteenth position on the Progressive Party's list and was re-elected when it won a second consecutive majority with 131 mandates.

During the 2016–20 parliament, Pantić Pilja was the deputy chair of the assembly committee on the judiciary, public administration, and local self-government; a member of the European integration committee; a deputy member of the committee on administrative, budgetary, mandate, and immunity issues; the head of the parliamentary friendship group with Cyprus; and a member of the parliamentary friendship groups with Austria, Azerbaijan, China, Germany, Greece, Iraq, Italy, Japan, Russia, Switzerland, and the United States of America.

Pantić Pilja is also a member of Serbia's delegation to the Parliamentary Assembly of the Council of Europe; she was first appointed as a substitute member in 2014 and was promoted to a full member in 2016. She sits with the European People's Party group; is a member of the committee on equality and non-discrimination and the committee on migration, refugees, and displaced persons; and is an alternate member of the committee on the election of judges to the European Court of Human Rights. In January 2020, she was appointed as vice-chair of the latter committee. She was also appointed to the sub-committee on refugee and migrant children and young people in March 2019 and has served as a member of the sub-committee on gender equality on two occasions.

She received the forty-second position on the Progressive Party's list in the 2020 Serbian parliamentary election and was elected to a fourth term when the list won a landslide majority with 188 mandates. She remains deputy chair of the judiciary committee, a member of Serbia's delegation to the parliamentary assembly of the Council of Europe, and the head of Serbia's parliamentary friendship group with Cyprus. She is a member of the friendship groups with Azerbaijan, China, Denmark, France, Germany, Israel, Italy, Japan, Russia, Spain, the United Arab Emirates, the United States of America.

References

1983 births
Living people
Politicians from Novi Sad
Members of the National Assembly (Serbia)
Members of the Parliamentary Assembly of the Council of Europe
Serbian Radical Party politicians
Serbian Progressive Party politicians
European People's Party politicians